Beris Simpson, better known as Prince Hammer, is a Jamaican reggae deejay, singer, and record producer.

Biography
Simpson was born at the Jubilee Hospital in Kingston and grew up in a Christian family in Kingston.

After deejaying on the Vee-Jay sound system in the early 1970s, Simpson initially recorded under his own name (as 'Berris Simpson') in the mid-1970s with producer Glen Brown for whom he recorded "Whole Lot of Sugar" and "Tel Aviv Rock", before adopting the 'Prince Hammer' name when he began producing his own recordings on labels that he owned such as Gold Cup and Belva, sold through his own record shop on Orange Street. He released several singles in the late 1970s for a variety of producers. He made a cameo appearance in the film Rockers, and found a wider audience via his Blacka Morwell-produced 1978 album Bible, released on Virgin Records' Front Line label. This was followed by the album Roots and Roots, released on Adrian Sherwood's Hitrun label in 1979.
 
Hammer toured the UK with Bim Sherman and Prince Far I in 1979 and later with punk rock bands such as The Clash and The Slits. A second album for Hit Run, Dancehall Style, was released in 1981, and they worked again on his 1985 album Vengeance.  He appeared on the track "The Heat" on Suns of Arqa's 1983 album Wadada Magic, he features on their live album with Prince Far I entitled Musical Revue which was recorded in 1982, and he provides vocals on "Libera Me" on their 1987 album Seven.  He also worked with Roy Cousins on the Respect I Man album (1989).

Hammer also worked as a producer, and produced Rod Taylor's If Jah Should Come Now album. Other artists that he produced included Echo Minott, Jennifer Lara, Toyan, Trinity, and George Nooks, and several of his productions were compiled on the Africa Iron Gate Showcase album, released on his own Berris label in 1982.

Discography

Albums
Bible (1978), Front Line
Roots Me Roots (1979), Hitrun/Miss Pat Walker
Roots Me Roots (1980), Little Luke
World War Dub Part 1 (1980), Baby Mother/Hitrun
Dancehall Style (1981), Hitrun
World War Dub Part 2 (1981), Baby Mother
Vengeance (1985), Melinda
Respect I Man (1989), Tamoki Wambesi
Back For More (2005), KSJ Productions

Compilations
Rastafari Bible 1976-1982 (2000), Patate

References

Jamaican reggae musicians
Living people
Musicians from Kingston, Jamaica
Year of birth missing (living people)
Suns of Arqa members